Aslam Hossain Saudagar is a Bangladeshi politician and the incumbent Member of Bangladesh Parliament from Kurigram-1.

Career
Saudagar was elected to parliament on 30 December 2018 as a [Bangladesh Awami League ] candidate from Kurigram-1.

References

Living people
11th Jatiya Sangsad members
Year of birth missing (living people)
Jatiya Party politicians